Bushnell is a city in McDonough County, Illinois, United States. The population was 2,718 at the 2020 census, down from 3,117 in 2010.

Geography
Bushnell is located in northeastern McDonough County at  (40.551667, -90.507921). Illinois Routes 9 and 41 pass through the city center as Cole Street. Route 9 goes west out of the city on Charles Street, leading  to Blandinsville, while to the east it leads  to Canton. Route 41 leads north  to Galesburg and south  to its terminus at U.S. Route 136.

The west side of the city drains to Drowning Fork, a south-flowing tributary of the East Fork of the La Moine River, while the east side drains to Shaw Creek, a southeast-flowing tributary of the Spoon River. The city is part of the Illinois River watershed.

History
The town was founded in 1854 when the Northern Cross Railroad built a line through the area. Nehemiah Bushnell was the president of the railroad, and townspeople honored him by naming their community after him. The railroad later became part of the Chicago, Burlington and Quincy Railroad, which continues to operate through Bushnell under the name Burlington Northern Santa Fe. Bushnell was also served by the Toledo, Peoria and Western Railway, now the Keokuk Junction Railway. Amtrak trains pass through the city but do not stop.

The Nagel Brothers of Bushnell were the first to invent a process of making rolled oats without having to steam the oats. Up until this time, the oats were first steamed to separate the groat from the hull. The patent for this new process was later sold to the Quaker Oats Company.

Bushnell is home to a Vaughan & Bushnell hammer factory and to Kitchen Cooked Potato Chips.

Demographics

As of the census of 2000, there were 3,221 people, 1,323 households, and 889 families residing in Bushnell. The racial makeup of the city was 98.79% White, 0.12% African American, 0.19% Native American, 0.09% Asian, 0.43% from other races, and 0.37% from two or more races. Hispanic or Latino of any race were 0.68% of the population.

There were 1,323 households, out of which 29.8% had children under the age of 18 living with them, 52.9% were married couples living together, 10.0% had a female householder with no husband present, and 32.8% were non-families. 27.7% of all households were made up of individuals, and 15.3% had someone living alone who was 65 years of age or older. The average household size was 2.43 and the average family size was 2.94.

In the city, the population was spread out, with 24.9% under the age of 18, 9.0% from 18 to 24, 26.4% from 25 to 44, 22.0% from 45 to 64, and 17.8% who were 65 years of age or older. The median age was 37 years. For every 100 females, there were 93.1 males. For every 100 females age 18 and over, there were 91.8 males.

The median income for a household in the town was $30,482, and the median income for a family was $38,450. Males had a median income of $27,266 versus $18,583 for females. The per capita income for the city was $17,263. About 12.2% of families and 17.0% of the population were below the poverty line, including 29.3% of those under age 18 and 6.5% of those age 65 or over.

Music
From 1991 to 2012, Bushnell was home to one of the largest Christian music and arts festivals in the world, known as the Cornerstone Festival. Each year around the 4th of July, 25,000 people from all over the world would descend on the small farm town to watch over 300 bands, authors and artists perform at the Cornerstone Farm Campgrounds. The festival was generally well received by locals, and businesses in the area would typically put up signs welcoming festival-goers to their town.

As a result of the location of the music festival, numerous live albums and videos have been recorded or filmed in Bushnell, including the annual Cornerstone Festival DVD. The festival's 20th anniversary DVD included interviews with local Bushnell citizens and business owners.

Cornerstone held its final festival in 2012 and no longer operates.

Popular culture
A short instrumental song titled "Let's Hear That String Part Again, Because I Don't Think They Heard It All the Way Out in Bushnell" appears on Sufjan Stevens' 2005 album Illinois.

Notable people
 Ta-Nehisi Paul Coates (born 1975), writer
 Seibert Q. Duntley (1911–1999), physicist and president of the Optical Society of America
 Charles Kuhn (1892–1989), cartoonist
 E. C. Mills (1873–1962), educator
 Earl Sheely (1893–1952), 1920s first baseman for Chicago White Sox

Horse show
Beginning in 1908, the Truman Pioneer Stud Farm in Bushnell was home to one of the largest horse shows in the Midwest. The show was well known for imported European horses. The Bushnell Horse Show returned in 2004 and has become one of the better draft horse hitch shows in the tri-state region. The Bushnell Horse Show features some of the best Belgian and Percheron hitches in the country. Teams have come from many different states and Canada to compete.

References

External links

Cornerstone Music and Arts Festival 

Cities in Illinois
Cities in McDonough County, Illinois